Domibacillus antri is a Gram-positive, strictly aerobic, capsule-forming, rod-shaped and motile bacterium from the genus of Domibacillus which has been isolated from soil from a cave in Lichuan, Hubei in China.

References

External links
Type strain of Domibacillus antri at BacDive -  the Bacterial Diversity Metadatabase

Bacillaceae
Bacteria described in 2016